Labor intensity is the relative proportion of labor (compared to capital) used in any given process. Its inverse is capital intensity.

Labor intensity has been declining since the onset of the Industrial Revolution in the late 1700s, while its inverse, capital intensity, has increased nearly exponentially since the latter half of the 20th century.

Labor-intensive industries 

A labor-intensive industry requires large amounts of manual labor to produce its goods or services. In such industries, labor costs are more of a concern than capital costs. Labor intensity is measured by its proportion to the amount of capital to produce goods or services. The higher the labor cost, the more labor intense is the business. Labor cost can vary because businesses can add or subtract workers based on business needs. When it comes to controlling expenses, labor intensive businesses have an advantage over those that are capital intensive and require a large investment in capital equipment, such as the automobile industry. When it comes to include economy of scale, labor intensive industries deal with many challenges: they cannot pay individual workers less by hiring more workers.

In case of high level of inflation in the economy, the labor-intensive industry can suffer to some extent. In times of high inflation, laborers are more likely to reveal their unwillingness to work at the same level of wage, because inflation lowers the value of their earnings.

Before the industrial revolution, the major part of the workforce was employed in agriculture. Producing food was very labor-intensive. Advances in technology and worker productivity have moved some industries away from labor-intensive status, but many remain, such as mining and agriculture.

Examples of labor-intensive sectors include:
 Nursing
 Textiles
 Agriculture — fruit picking is often done by hand as it is difficult for machines to pick, for example, strawberries or apples from trees.
 Teaching
 Mining
 Niche products — If a company specializes in a niche market, there will be less scope for economies of scale and lower fixed costs. In this case, we tend to see higher labor-intensive production. Pottery is an example of niche product.

The role in the economy 

For underdeveloped and developing economies, a labor intensive industry structure can be a better option than a capital intensive one for quick economic development. For countries which are not wealthy and generate low levels of income, labor intensive industry can bring economic growth and prosperity. In most cases, these low income countries suffer from scarcity of capital but have an abundant labor force, such as some Africa countries. The use of such an abundant labor force may lead to industrial growth.

China has a large workforce and manufacturing industries contribute about 35 per cent to country's gross domestic product. The country has also become one of the world's leading manufacturing bases and leading suppliers of products such as household electric appliances, garments, toys, shoes and light industrial products.

Supply of perfectly skilled labor to any industry can boost the industry growth rate. In this way, underdeveloped countries can improve their industrial economy without heavy capital investment.

Moreover, exportation of the products manufactured by labor intensive industries can strengthen the export base of any developing country. These exports help the economies in earning foreign exchange, which can be used for importing essential goods and services.

Measurement 

There are multiple ways to measure labor intensity:

 Labor-capital ratio :the relationship between employment and capital stock. This ratio indicates the relative use of factors in an activity and the extent to which it is labor-intensive compared to capital-intensive.
 The ratio between employment and value added, which indicates the labor intensity of production. This measure indicates the extent to which an activity absorbs labor for each unit of value added.

These two measures are different ways of measuring labor intensity, Neither is superior in itself, the choice of measure depends on the specific issue of interest.

However there is a limitation of this two measures: they only measure direct labor intensity and they exclude the extent to which sectors are linked to another sector of the economy. For instance, a given sector may  itself not be particularly labor-intensive, but it might utilize (as inputs) the output of other sectors that are highly labor-intensive.

A solution could be to consider employment multipliers by sector.

Employment multipliers essentially indicate what increase (decrease) in economy-wide jobs could be associated with a given increase (decrease) in final output of a sector.

References 

Intensity